Soliant Health is a healthcare staffing company that provides medical staff to various healthcare facilities throughout the United States. In 2020, Soliant moved its headquarters to Peachtree Corners, Georgia, a suburban city of Atlanta.

History
In November 1991, Soliant Health was founded as Elite Medical by David Alexander, with the company initially specializing in travel healthcare. Alexander interpreted a model set by retailer Nordstrom as a way to reduce turnover among his staff by boosting their morale, which in turn would increase the confidence of the healthcare workers they provided. In July 2002, Elite Medical was acquired by Adecco Group North America (then MPS Group Inc.) and was rebranded in March 2003 as Soliant Health, with David Alexander appointed as its president.

Most Beautiful Hospitals
Since 2009, Soliant Health has ranked "The 20 Most Beautiful Hospitals" in the United States. On their first year making the rankings on the 2009 list, Soliant Health cited a February 2009 study by the University of Michigan School of Public Health that one of the factors that made patients happy was the appearance of the hospital.

The 2015 list includes:

References

Human resource management consulting firms
Companies based in Atlanta
Consulting firms established in 1991
1991 establishments in Georgia (U.S. state)
Medical outsourcing companies of the United States